Admiral Sir John Byng Frewen GCB (28 March 1911 – 1 September 1975) was Commander-in-Chief Naval Home Command.

Naval career
Frewen joined the Royal Navy in 1924. He served in World War II in the Russian Convoys and as Squadron Navigating Officer for Aircraft Carriers in the Pacific. He also served in the Korean War as Commander of HMS Mounts Bay.

He was appointed Chief of Staff to the Commander-in-Chief, Home Fleet, in 1959 and then became Flag Officer Second in Command Far East Fleet in 1961. He went on to be Vice Chief of the Naval Staff in 1963 and Commander-in-Chief, Home Fleet, in 1965. He was then appointed Commander-in-Chief, Portsmouth, in 1967. Finally he was appointed the first Commander-in-Chief Naval Home Command (following the merger of the Portsmouth and Plymouth Commands) in 1969. In that capacity he welcomed Sir Alec Rose back to Portsmouth after his single-handed trip around the world. Frewen was also First and Principal Naval Aide-de-Camp to the Queen from 1968 to 1970. He retired in 1970.

In retirement Frewen transferred Brickwall House School, a specialist school for boys with dyslexia, into an educational trust and renamed the school Frewen College. In 1972 he was Chairman of the Royal Navy Club of 1765 & 1785 (United 1889).

References

|-

|-

|-

|-

1911 births
1975 deaths
Knights Grand Cross of the Order of the Bath
Royal Navy admirals
Royal Navy officers of World War II
Lords of the Admiralty